Epitome of Illusions is the third studio album by the Norwegian symphonic black metal band Limbonic Art released in 1998 on Nocturnal Art Productions. The album itself is composed of rerecorded material from the band's pre-label demos, so it can be considered both as a studio and a compilation album, although Morfeus said in an interview that it is not a full release.

Track listing

Personnel
Daemon - guitars, bass, vocals
Morfeus - guitars, keyboards, vocals, drum programming
Peter Lundell - producer, mixing
Thomas Hvitstein - band photography

External links
Epitome of Illusions at Allmusic

1998 albums
Limbonic Art albums